This is a list of airports and heliports in the Faroe Islands, sorted by location.

The Faroe Islands are a group of islands in Northern Europe, between the Norwegian Sea and the north Atlantic Ocean, about halfway from Iceland to Norway. They have been an autonomous region of Denmark since 1948. There is one airport and a number of public heliports. The domestic helicopter services are operated by Atlantic Airways.

Koltur also has a helipad that is used for scheduled passenger flights ran by Atlantic Airways. Skopun and Tórshavn (a second one, near the hospital) have helipads used for ambulance flights. Abandoned heliports are found in Trøllanes, Gásadalur and Múli, all of which were dismantled soon after the respective roads to these villages opened. Discussions about a helipad in Nólsoy for the purpose of medical evacuations aired in 2014 and continue to play.

Tórshavn's municipal plan includes a proposal for a new airport at Glyvursnes,
 due south of the suburb Argir, but the cost and political situation make this unlikely in the foreseeable future. The runway and terminal at Vágar Airport have recently (2011) been extended and upgraded respectively, and the airport forms an important part of the economy of the island of Vágar.

See also 
 List of airports in Denmark
 Transport in the Faroe Islands
 List of airports by ICAO code: E#EK – Denmark and the Faroe Islands
 Wikipedia: Airline destination lists: Europe#Faroe Islands (Denmark)
 List of the busiest airports in the Nordic countries

References

External links 
 Faroe Islands AIP

Faroe Islands
Airports in the Faroe Islands
Airports
Airports
+Faroe Islands